Year 124 (CXXIV) was a leap year starting on Friday (link will display the full calendar) of the Julian calendar. At the time, it was known as the Year of the Consulship of Glabrio and Flaccus (or, less frequently, year 877 Ab urbe condita). The denomination 124 for this year has been used since the early medieval period, when the Anno Domini calendar era became the prevalent method in Europe for naming years.

Events 
 By place 

 Roman Empire 
 Emperor Hadrian begins to rebuild the Olympeion in Athens.
 Antinous becomes Hadrian's beloved companion on his journeys through the Roman Empire. 
 During a voyage to Greece, Hadrian is initiated in the ancient rites known as the  Eleusinian Mysteries.

 Asia 
 In northern India, Nahapana, ruler of the Scythians, is defeated and dies in battle while fighting against King Gautamiputra Satakarni. This defeat destroys the Scythian dynasty of the Western Kshatrapas.

Births 
 Apuleius, Numidian novelist, writer, public speaker (approximate date)

Deaths 
 Marcus Annius Verus, father of Marcus Aurelius
 Nahapana, ruler of the Scythians (approximate date)
 Sixtus I, bishop of Rome according to Roman Catholic tradition (approximate date)

References